Chal-e Monar (also Romanized as Chāl-e Monār and Chal-i-Munār) is a village in Lalar and Katak Rural District, Chelo District, Andika County, Khuzestan Province, Iran. At the 2006 census, its population was 126, in 19 families.

References 

Populated places in Andika County